Edinburgh Gateway station is a railway station and interchange at Gogar in Edinburgh, Scotland, which opened on 11 December 2016. It is served by ScotRail and Edinburgh Trams, and serves both Gogar and Edinburgh Airport, to which it is connected by the tram line.

Background

As part of the Strategic Transports Project Review, which plans what is going to happen with Scotland's transport over the next 20 years, 29 investment priorities were identified in support of the future growth of Scotland's businesses and communities. One of these was the construction of Gogar station for better access to Edinburgh Airport through onward travel on the Edinburgh tram network as well as the rest of the area through the integration with the tram system. This may be to compensate for the scrapping of the Edinburgh Airport Rail Link and the station was part of the original proposal. The station would also thought to be delivered sooner.

EGIP
The railway station is part of the Edinburgh to Glasgow Improvement Programme (EGIP), a major Scottish transport project involving infrastructure improvements and electrification of most railway lines between Glasgow and Edinburgh. It was intended that services between the two cities will increase to 13 trains per hour with fastest time being 35 minutes but after the Scottish Department For Transport reviewed the project, it was down scaled and services will continue to be every 15 minutes but with new, longer electric trains, which will at least meet the journey time targets originally set out. The project also includes the electrification of eight routes and 350 km of existing lines. The Shotts Line will have an increase in services with the provision of a limited express service.

Location and infrastructure

The railway station is located at the A8 to the east of Gogar. The station has two platforms. The platforms have been constructed to accommodate the longest trains currently operating in Scotland (London North Eastern Railway). A chord is proposed a few miles to the north of the station, near the River Almond crossing, to provide another link between Glasgow and Edinburgh with potential for increasing services through.

The original design for the station included a 1st floor and high level bridge but following consultation these were removed with an at-grade bridge providing easier access. The design of the station is to provide a secure covered area for parking of 100 cycles as well as five cycle lockers. This is located next to the station building and is monitored by CCTV. Lifts inside the station building are large enough to accommodate bicycles. The station provides an interchange with Edinburgh Trams to Edinburgh and the airport as well as providing more access to The Gyle Shopping Centre through a subway under the A8.

History
Network Rail submitted its plans for the interchange on 9 October 2009 following completion of the pre-planning submission consultation. Gogar was the first infrastructure project to go the through the National Planning Framework. The consultation involved four public exhibitions with clear public support for the investments and the proposal.

When the tram line was built in 2013, provision was made for Edinburgh Gateway but it would not open until the same time as the railway station. In February 2015, a contract to build the station was awarded to Balfour Beatty with work commencing in April 2015. The new station building was designed by IDP Architects.

In June 2016 the station was badly vandalised while still under construction. Vehicles and windows were damaged.

Edinburgh Gateway station was officially opened by the Scottish Government Minister for Transport and the Islands Humza Yousaf on 9 November 2016. The station opened to the public on 11 December 2016.

Services
Edinburgh Gateway station is served half-hourly by trains operating on the Fife Circle Line, and hourly by services operating to Perth, Dundee and Inverness.

Fife Circle trains scheduled to stop at Edinburgh Gateway will normally skip the nearby  station.

All Edinburgh Trams services are currently scheduled to call at Edinburgh Gateway.

References

External links
Video footage of Edinburgh Gateway Railway Station
Video footage of Edinburgh Gateway Tram Stop

Airport railway stations in the United Kingdom
Gateway Station
DfT Category E stations
Edinburgh Trams stops
Railway stations in Edinburgh
Railway stations served by ScotRail
Railway stations in Great Britain opened in 2016
Railway stations opened by Network Rail
IDP Architects railway stations